María José is the debut solo album by Mexican pop singer María José. Released in 2007, the album is her first solo attempt after the split of the successful pop group Kabah.

Track listing

Singles 
 ¿Quien Eres Tú? (2007) 
 Me Equivoque (2007)
 ¿Donde Está? (2008)

Charts

Certifications

References

2007 debut albums
María José (singer) albums